Japanese football in 1956.

Emperor's Cup

National team

Results

Players statistics

Births
January 23 - Kazumi Tsubota
April 2 - Shigemitsu Sudo
April 10 - Masafumi Yokoyama
April 24 - Hisashi Kato
August 25 - Takeshi Okada
November 21 - Mitsugu Nomura

External links

 
Seasons in Japanese football